Akora Khattak railway station is located in Akora Khattak town, Nowshera district of Khyber Pakhtunkhwa province of the Pakistan.

See also
 List of railway stations in Pakistan
 Pakistan Railways

References

Railway stations in Nowshera District
Railway stations on Karachi–Peshawar Line (ML 1)